Ludic Student Theatre is a theatre company in Iași, Romania, specializing in plays for young audiences. The company is hosted by the Iași Students' Culture House.

History
Ludic Theatre was founded in 1978, by the stage director Aurel Luca. During the time, it participated in more than 75 international festivals, and won around 500 trophies and diplomas. It is the first Romanian theatre that joined the International Amateur Theatre Association, in 1993.

Starting 2008, each year in December, the company organises the international "Ludic Theatre Days Festival" (Romanian: "Zilele Teatrului Ludic").

References

External links
Official website
Teatrul Studențesc Ludic  at ccsiasi.ro

Theatre
Theatres in Iași
Student theatre
Youth theatre companies
Event venues established in 1978
1978 establishments in Romania